In geometry, an angle of a polygon is formed by two sides of the polygon that share an endpoint.  For a simple (non-self-intersecting) polygon, regardless of whether it is convex or non-convex, this angle is called an interior angle (or ) if a point within the angle is in the interior of the polygon. A polygon has exactly one internal angle per vertex.

If every internal angle of a simple polygon is less than π radians (180°), then the polygon is called convex.

Properties
 The sum of the internal angle and the external angle on the same vertex is π radians (180°).
 The sum of all the internal angles of a simple polygon is π(n−2) radians or 180(n–2) degrees, where n is the number of sides. The formula can be proved by using mathematical induction: starting with a triangle, for which the angle sum is 180°, then replacing one side with two sides connected at another vertex, and so on.
 The sum of the external angles of any simple convex or non-convex polygon, if only one of the two external angles is assumed at each vertex, is 2π radians (360°).
 The measure of the exterior angle at a vertex is unaffected by which side is extended: the two exterior angles that can be formed at a vertex by extending alternately one side or the other are vertical angles and thus are equal.

Extension to crossed polygons
The interior angle concept can be extended in a consistent way to crossed polygons such as star polygons by using the concept of directed angles. In general, the interior angle sum in degrees of any closed polygon, including crossed (self-intersecting) ones, is then given by 180(n–2k)°, where n is the number of vertices, and the strictly positive integer k is the number of total (360°) revolutions one undergoes by walking around the perimeter of the polygon. In other words, the sum of all the exterior angles is 2πk radians or 360k degrees. Example: for ordinary convex polygons and concave polygons, k = 1, since the exterior angle sum is 360°, and one undergoes only one full revolution by walking around the perimeter.

References

External links
Internal angles of a triangle
Interior angle sum of polygons: a general formula - Provides an interactive Java activity that extends the interior angle sum formula for simple closed polygons to include crossed (complex) polygons.

Angle
Euclidean plane geometry
Elementary geometry
Polygons